This article contains a list of fossil-bearing stratigraphic units in the state of Nevada, U.S.

Sites

See also

 Paleontology in Nevada

References

 

Nevada
Stratigraphic units
Stratigraphy of Nevada
Nevada geography-related lists
United States geology-related lists